Simone Bolelli was the defending champion, but chose not to compete.
Italian Thomas Fabbiano won the title over David Guez 6–0, 6–3

Seeds

Draw

Finals

Top half

Bottom half

References
 Main Draw
 Qualifying Draw

Guzzini Challenger - Singles
2013 Singles